Trench foot  is a type of foot damage due to moisture. Initial symptoms often include tingling or itching which can progress to numbness. The feet may become red or bluish in color. As the condition worsens the feet can start to swell and smell of decay. Complications may include skin breakdown or infection.

Trench foot occurs due to prolonged exposure of the feet to cold, damp, and often unsanitary conditions. Unlike frostbite, trench foot usually occurs at temperatures above freezing, and can be classed as a form of non-freezing cold injury. Onset can be as rapid as 10 hours. Risk factors include overly tight boots and not moving. The underlying mechanism is believed to involve constriction of blood vessels resulting in insufficient blood flow to the feet. Diagnosis is based on symptoms and examination.

Prevention involves keeping the feet warm, dry, and clean. After the condition has occurred, pain medications may be required during the gradual rewarming process. Pain may persist for months following treatment. Surgery to remove damaged tissue or amputation may be necessary.

Those in the military are most commonly affected, though cases may also occur in the homeless. The condition was first described during Napoleon Bonaparte's retreat from Russia in the winter of 1812. The word trench in the name is a reference to trench warfare, mainly associated with World War I.

Signs and symptoms

Trench foot frequently begins with the feeling of tingling and an itch in affected feet, and subsequently progresses to numbness or pain. The feet may become red or blue as a result of poor blood supply. Later, as the condition worsens feet can start to swell and smell of decay as muscle and tissue become macerated. The feet often feel warm to touch.

Advanced trench foot often involves blisters and open sores, which lead to fungal infections; this is sometimes called jungle rot. It is marked by severe short-term pain when feeling returns.

Causes
Exposure to these environmental conditions causes deterioration and destruction of the capillaries, and leads to damage of the surrounding flesh. Excessive sweating (hyperhidrosis) has long been regarded as a contributory cause; unsanitary, cold, and wet conditions can also cause trench foot.

Diagnosis
The diagnosis of trench foot does not usually require any investigations unless an underlying infection of bone is suspected, when an x-ray is performed. A full blood count might show a high white blood cell count if infection is present and inflammatory markers such as an erythrocyte sedimentation rate or C-reactive protein (CRP) might highlight severity.

Prevention
Trench foot can be prevented by keeping the feet clean, warm, and dry.

Treatment
Keeping the feet dry is the first line treatment. The initial aim is to protect undamaged tissue of the feet and prevent any further destruction of the feet. Applying emollient helps.

The mainstay of treatment, like the treatment of gangrene, is surgical debridement, and often includes amputation.

Self-treatment consists of changing socks two or three times a day and usage of plenty of talcum powder. Whenever possible, shoes and socks should be taken off, the feet bathed for five minutes and patted dry, talcum powder applied, and feet elevated to let air get to them.

History

Trench foot was first reported in 1812 by the French army surgeon Dominique Jean Larrey when Napoleon’s army was retreating from Russia.

It was also a problem for soldiers engaged in trench warfare during the winters of World War I (hence the name). It was also discovered in World War I that a key preventive measure was regular foot inspections; soldiers would be paired and each partner made responsible for the feet of the other, and they would generally apply whale oil to prevent trench foot. If left to their own devices, soldiers might neglect to take off their own boots and socks to dry their feet each day, but when it was made the responsibility of another, this became less likely.

The condition has been documented in survivors of shipwrecks and downed aeroplanes. Trench foot made a reappearance in the British Army during the Falklands War, in 1982. The condition was reported at the 1998 and 2007 Glastonbury Festivals.

See also
 Chilblains
 Trench fever

References

External links

 

Foot diseases
Skin conditions resulting from physical factors
Effects of external causes
Trench warfare
Gangrene
Immersion foot syndromes
World War I
Military medicine in World War I